Steve Devlin may refer to:

Steve Devlin, footballer for Poole Town F.C.
Steve Devlin, songwriter on the Skankin' Pickle's album The Green Album